Toowoomba was an electoral district of the Legislative Assembly in the Australian state of Queensland. The seat was in Toowoomba.

History

The seat had two incarnations. The first was from 1873 to 1878 and the second from 1912 to 1960.

In 1873, it was created by renaming the electoral district of Drayton & Toowoomba. In 1878, its name was changed back to Drayton & Toowoomba (but as a 2-member constituency).

Its second incarnation began in 1912 when Drayton & Toowoomba split into Toowoomba,  East Toowoomba and Drayton. The sitting member for Drayton & Toowoomba, James Tolmie, successfully stood for election in Toowoomba in 1912 after the split.

Toowoomba was abolished in the 1960 redistribution. The sitting member, Mervyn Anderson, successfully stood for election in the new seat of Toowoomba East in the 1960 election.

Members for Toowoomba
The members who represented Toowoomba are listed below.

See also
 Electoral districts of Queensland
 Members of the Queensland Legislative Assembly by year
 :Category:Members of the Queensland Legislative Assembly by name

References

Darling Downs
Toowoomba
Toowoomba
1873 establishments in Australia
1878 disestablishments in Australia
1912 establishments in Australia
1960 disestablishments in Australia
Constituencies established in 1873
Constituencies established in 1912
Constituencies disestablished in 1878
Constituencies disestablished in 1960